The 1951 Soviet football championship was the 19th seasons of competitive football in the Soviet Union and the 13th among teams of sports societies and factories. CDSA Moscow again won the championship becoming the Soviet domestic champions for the fifth time and tied with Dynamo for the number of league titles won.

The defending champions CDSA defeated their main rivals Dinamo (2–1, 2–0) and took this season title.

Honours

Notes = Number in parentheses is the times that club has won that honour. * indicates new record for competition

Soviet Union football championship

Class A

Class B

Top goalscorers

Class A
Avtandil Gogoberidze (Dinamo Tbilisi) – 16 goals

References

External links
 1951 Soviet football championship. RSSSF